A Quest to Heal is a 2020 Singaporean Chinese-language drama series. It tells the story of a heroine (Carrie Wong) and an imperial guard (Qi Yuwu) who accidentally travels from the Ming Dynasty to modern Singapore, and together they face the evil palace forces, who plan to rule both worlds.

Consisting of 32 episodes, it premiered on 20 July 2020, airing on 9pm weekdays at Channel 8. It also aired on Astro AEC in Malaysia, and is available on meWATCH.

Broadcast

Plot
During the 1500s Ming Dynasty, a heroine named Luo Ming Yi (Carrie Wong) sneaks into the heavily guarded imperial jail to rescue her senior, the famous doctor Li Shizhen (Xu Bin). She is stopped by the agent Bi Zheng (Qi Yu Wu), a Brocaded Robe Guard under the command of the powerful Eunuch Sun (Bryan Wong). The two engage in a fierce fight and unknowingly travel through time to Singapore in 2020. They encounter the descendants of Li Shizhen, who now owns a failing traditional herbal restaurant.

Luo Ming Yi and Bi Zheng have no choice but to cooperate and help the restaurant. But their time-travelling feat is noticed by the evil Eunuch Sun, who has plans to take over both worlds. Can the two martial artists stop the evil plan before it is too late?

Cast

Ming Dynasty

Modern

Production 
It is the first time MediaCorp has produced a period drama after a hiatus of 15 years. The full period drama episodes occupies a total of seven episodes, including rare martial arts scenes in local dramas. The period scene was filmed in Hengdian World Studios, one of the largest film studios in China. The traditional costumes were designed by Chinese designer Chen Minzheng, whose previous works include Empresses in the Palace, The Stand-In.

The drama series was initially planned to be released on 8 May 2020, but was moved to 20 July 2020 due to the COVID-19 pandemic and the Singaporean general election.

Awards and nominations

Asian Academy Creative Awards

Star Awards 2021
A Quest to Heal is nominated for five awards. It swept almost every award including Best Theme Song and Best Drama Serial except Best Actress.

International Emmy Awards

References

External links
A Quest to Heal on meWATCH

Singaporean television series
2020 Singaporean television series debuts
2020 Singaporean television series endings
Chinese-language television shows
Singaporean time travel television series
Television series set in the Ming dynasty
Television series set in the 16th century
Television series set in 2020
Television series about parallel universes
Medical television series